George Smith  was an early 19th-century member of the United States House of Representatives from Pennsylvania's 5th congressional district.

He was elected as a Democratic-Republican to the Eleventh and Twelfth Congresses, serving from March 4, 1809 to March 3, 1813.

References 

18th-century births
19th-century deaths
Year of birth unknown
Place of birth unknown
Year of death unknown
Place of death unknown
Democratic-Republican Party members of the United States House of Representatives from Pennsylvania